Walsham le Willows is a village in Suffolk, England, located around 2½ miles (4 km) south-east of Stanton, and lies in the Mid Suffolk council district. Queen Elizabeth I granted Walsham le Willows to Nicholas Bacon, Lord Keeper of the Great Seal, in 1559.

Because the village is documented unusually fully in surviving records of the time, the Cambridge historian John Hatcher chose to use it as the setting for his semi-fictionalised account of the effects of the mid-14th century plague epidemic in England, The Black Death: A Personal History (2008).

Sport and leisure
Walsham le Willows has a Non-League football club Walsham-le-Willows F.C. currently in the Eastern Counties League who play at Sumner Road.

Sources 
Kenneth Melton Dodd (editor), The Field-Book of Walsham-le-Willows 1577 (Ipswich: Suffolk Records Society, 1974).

References

External links
 Official website

 
Villages in Suffolk
Civil parishes in Suffolk
Mid Suffolk District